Holy Cross Catholic Secondary School (sometimes abbreviated to HC, or HCSS) is a Catholic secondary school located in Kingston, Ontario, Canada offering education for about 1,100 students in grades 9-12.  It is one of three Catholic high schools in the city. The principal is Terri Daniel.

History
Students entering Grade 13 (OAC) at Regiopolis-Notre Dame for the 1985-1986 school year were the last to pay fees as private school students. The Ontario government had extended full funding to Catholic secondary schools during the preceding four years.

Then as now, a Catholic secondary education was prized by students and parents alike. Crowding at the school during that year was unprecedented. The school had been built as a senior elementary facility under the funding formula of the late 1970s. In September 1985 there were over 1300 students in a facility built to house 750. Over twenty portables circled the school. The day was divided into six one-hour periods and, in order to stagger the lunch periods, eighteen of the thirty periods were officially "lunch," with one-third of the student body on an unassigned period.

Growth was predicted to continue and so the school administration, in concert with the then Frontenac-Lennox & Addington County Roman Catholic Separate School Board, decided in early 1986 to launch a second Catholic secondary school.

In March a meeting was held in the school Library with the Grade Nine students from the western territory of the Board. The newly-appointed Principal, Mo Daniel, announced that these students would be the pioneers of the new school, as they would be the Grade Ten class of the as-yet-unnamed second Catholic high school. The Grade Nine class would consist of the Grade Eights from the western feeder schools.

Holy Cross opened its doors in September of 1986 in quarters leased from the Frontenac County Board of Education. Mr. Daniel was quoted in a Whig Standard article just prior to the school's opening: "There is a misconception that this building (Victoria School) is condemned and therefore is falling apart. It is a beautiful building." Clearly Queen's University agreed, as almost fifteen years later Victoria School was to be renovated and incorporated into the new School of Business.

Holy Cross also held classes in part of Kingston Collegiate, which graciously agreed to share its facility with the new school. Holy Cross began with approximately seventeen teachers and two hundred and thirty-five students. One of the students summed up very simply the general feeling of the school community: "It's (Holy Cross) bigger and it's more convenient. I'll like it better here, I think. At Regi, it was too crowded."

During the next four years, staff and students alike pulled together to create a school community in a less-than-ideal physical facility. The curriculum encompassed all subject areas, including music and drama. A full array of sports and extracurricular activities was offered by the dedicated staff. Students in uniform gamely mingled with the "non-uniformed" student body of K.C.V.I.

During these months and years, much discussion was held by all stakeholders in the enterprise, from students right to the Ministry of Education. Mr. Patrick Slack, Superintendent of Education, had stated from the outset that the Board wished to build a new facility in Kingston Township. At that time, however, the Ministry of Education was adamant that there would be no new schools built as long as there was excess space in public schools. Trustee Bill Hurding encapsulated the spirit of those times when he stated that the best stance was to work hard at making the best use of available facilities while continuing to press for a new high school.

The school continued to grow, adding Grade 11, Grade 12 and OAC courses as those Grade Nines who met in the Regiopolis-Notre Dame Library advanced in their high school careers. Numbers were becoming problematic for the 1987-1988 school year in the shared facility. A parent, Bill Coppens, commented in a Whig Standard article in March: "I think a lot of the credit has to go to (Holy Cross principal) Mo Daniel and the principal of KCVI (John Boone), that they've actually worked out a system that works very well. I only hope we don't blow it in the next year."

In fact that did not happen. The first graduating class was jubilant in the knowledge that their pioneering spirit, the leadership of their teachers, and hard work by countless persons dedicated to Catholic education, would culminate in the building of a new facility on Woodbine Road in Kingston Township. The Holy Spirit was indeed at work in the hearts and minds of all concerned.Despite construction delays, the $15-million dollar facility opened its doors to 51 educators and 825 students in September of 1990. Archbishop Francis J. Spence blessed the school at an official opening ceremony of October 28, 1990. The school boasted 110,000 square feet with a state-of-the-art technology wing, lecture theatre, gym, and classrooms ready for the challenges of the 1990s and beyond.
Growth continues to be a hallmark of Holy Cross. In 1998 a second gym was added to the facility as well as a permanent addition of two stories with sixteen much-needed classrooms.
In 2001-2002 Holy Cross had an enrolment of 1190 students and 82 teachers. Only two of the teachers who were pioneers in 1986-1987 remain, but their spirit lives on in an enthusiastic staff of both young and highly experienced teachers. Grade 9 student Dave Stevenson predicted what would be perhaps the distinguishing characteristic of the Holy Cross ethos in September of 1986, "I think there is going to be good communication between the teachers and the students." And so it has been.Holy Cross is well known for its achievements and growth in academics, arts, athletics, technology, and faith. Holy Cross prides itself on its commitment to service. The school is able to offer an extensive and diverse curriculum. Students have an opportunity to take traditional subjects, but can also challenge themselves in the arts or technology. Students have received many awards and citations for academic success. The award plaques mounted in the gymnasium attest to the success of the Holy Cross sports teams. The Holy Cross music groups and technology students have won regional, provincial, national, and international awards. The school offers many extra-curricular activities including band, musical, dance club, Students' Council, two Specialist High Skills Majors in Information and Communications Technology and Environmental, and CICS Crusaders in Community Service. Holy Cross students and staff are proud of their accomplishments and school. The slogan, "Once a Crusader, Always a Crusader" rings true for every graduate from Holy Cross.

Athletics 
Holy Cross has a history of athletic success at the local, provincial and national levels. School alumni include NHL defenceman Jay McKee, olympic wrestler Paul Ragusa, and Canadian hockey star Jayna Hefford. In recent years, the Holy Cross Football Team has dominated the sport, winning consecutive OFSAA titles in 2018 and 2019.

Musicals

The annual musical and prominent theatre-arts program are a staple of student life at HC. Founded by staff members Sean Roberts and Ann O'Brien, the school's legacy of musical theatre continues to thrive under director Stacy Check-Drumm and music conductor David Orser.

*play, not a musical

Notable alumni
 Jay McKee, hockey player (Pittsburgh Penguins, NHL)
 Jayna Hefford, Canadian women's hockey gold medallist (Team Canada)
Paul Ragusa, Canadian wrestler and olympic wrestling coach
 Nathan Robinson, hockey player (Espoo Blues, SM-liiga)
 Brent Johnson, football player (British Columbia Lions)
 Mike McCullough, football player (Saskatchewan Roughriders)
 Jamie Arniel, hockey player (Providence Bruins, AHL)
 Tim Cronk, football player (British Columbia Lions)
 Matt O'Donnell, football player (Cincinnati Bengals, Edmonton Eskimos)
 Shane Wright (ice hockey), hockey player (Seattle Kraken, NHL)

Awards 
 Faculty of Education of Queen's University Associate Teacher of the Year awards - John Esford for the 1998–1999 school year and Frank Halligan for the 2006–2007 school year.
 In 2006, Spencer Watson won the Mayor's Award for Youth Volunteerism.
 In 2001, Oleg Shamovsky was named a $4,500 Manning Young Canadian Innovator, for his project that identified anomalies of the electrolytic oxidation of aluminum, and won the gold medal in the Senior category of the Physical Sciences Division.
 In 2014 Ryan Purdy won the Provincial Gold Medal in the Ontario Technological Skills Competition in Graphic Design (Presentation). Ryan was a member and graduate of the SHSM Specialist High Skills Major focus program in Information and Communications Technology taught by teacher Mr. John Esford.
 In 2015 Claudia Pawlak won the Provincial Gold Medal in the Ontario Technological Skills Competition in Photography. Claudia was a member and graduate of the SHSM Specialist High Skills Major focus program in Information and Communications Technology taught by teacher Mr. John Esford.
 In 2016 Ryan Murray won third place in the Ontario Ministry of Labour Student Video Safety Contest. Ryan was a member of the SHSM Specialist High Skills Major focus program in Information and Communications Technology taught by teacher Mr. John Esford.
In 2017 Andrew Donnelly won the Provincial Silver Medal in the Ontario Technological Skills Competition in Photography. Andrew was a member and graduate of the SHSM Specialist High Skills Major focus program in Information and Communications Technology taught by teacher Mr. John Esford, and is recognized as winning his school's  “SHSM award” in his grade 12 year.
In 2019, Tim Pendergast won the Berk Brean Trophy, presented annually to the High School Coach of the Year by the Queen's Football Club

See also
List of high schools in Ontario

References

External links
 Official site
 Official athletics site
 District site

High schools in Kingston, Ontario
Educational institutions established in 1986
1986 establishments in Ontario